Michael James Cann (born 4 July 1965) is a former cricketer from Wales. He played first-class and one-day cricket for Glamorgan, Orange Free State, Griqualand West, Boland and the Impalas between 1986 and 1994. He was a left-handed batsman and right-arm offbreak bowler.

A middle-order and opening batsman, Cann scored four first-class centuries, three of them in South Africa. His highest score was 141 (after scoring 80 in the first innings) when Griqualand West successfully chased 291 to defeat Boland in 1990–91. His one century for Glamorgan was the 109 he scored against Somerset in 1989. His best first-class bowling figures were 5 for 68 (match figures of 41–17–87–8) for Boland B against Western Transvaal in 1993–94, his last first-class season.

Cann studied Biochemistry at Swansea University, and has worked as a biochemist since the end of his cricket career.

References

External links
 

1965 births
Cricketers from Cardiff
Glamorgan cricketers
Boland cricketers
Griqualand West cricketers
Free State cricketers
Living people
Welsh cricketers
Huntingdonshire cricketers
British Universities cricketers
Alumni of Swansea University
Welsh biochemists